Chehregan (also Romanized as Chehregān; also known as Chegrevan, Chehraqān, Chehravān, Chehrehqān, and Chehreqān) is a village in Chehregan Rural District of Tasuj District, Shabestar County, East Azerbaijan province, Iran. At the 2006 National Census, its population was 1,300 in 409 households. The following census in 2011 counted 1,225 people in 406 households. The latest census in 2016 showed a population of 1,297 people in 471 households; it was the largest village in its rural district.

References 

Shabestar County

Populated places in East Azerbaijan Province

Populated places in Shabestar County